Libération-Nord ("Liberation-North") was one of the principal resistance movements in the northern occupied zone of France during the Second World War.

It was one of the eight great networks making up the National Council of the Resistance.

History 
Initially an underground newspaper, from December 1940 to November 1941 Libération-Nord was transformed into a resistance movement. Aiming to express the secret movements of the non-communist unions among the Confédération générale du travail  the Confédération Française des Travailleurs Chrétiens and the Section française de l'Internationale ouvrière (SFIO), Libération-Nord was formed around Christian Pineau and the team of the Manifeste des douze. The movement was not entirely socialist but the leadership was socialist.

In 1942, two resistance networks were created from within Libération-Nord under the command of the Bureau central de renseignements et d'action:
 Phalanx in the zone Sud, created by Christian Pineau
 Cohors-Asturies in the zone Nord.

In early 1943 Libération-Nord began to organise armed groups under the impetus of Jean Cavaillès and Colonel Zarapoff. Represented at the National Council of the Resistance, where he exerted the influence of the underground SFIO, the movement withheld its participation from the Mouvements unis de la Résistance in December 1943.

With the instar of the Organisation civile et militaire, Libération-Nord failed to create a great workers' party with its origins in the resistance.

Principal members 
 Pierre Boursicot
 Jean Aimé Caillau
 Jean Cavaillès
 Michel Collinet
 Jean-Baptiste Daviais
 Paul Rassinier
 Jean Gosset
 René Iché
 Marcel Mérigonde
 Christian Pineau
 Yves Rocard
 Louis Saillant
 François Tanguy-Prigent
 Colonel Zarapoff

Bibliography 
  Alya Aglan, La Résistance sacrifiée. Le mouvement Libération-Nord, Flammarion, 1999, nouvelle édition, « Champs », 2006.
  Christian Pineau, La Simple Vérité. Regard sur la période 1940-1945, Juillard, 1960
  Marc Sadoun, Les Socialistes sous l'Occupation, Presses de la Fondation nationale des sciences politiques, 1982

See also 
Libération-Sud

French Resistance networks and movements